Huw William Edmund Edwards (born 12 April 1953) is a British Labour Party politician who was the Member of Parliament (MP) for Monmouth over two separate terms.

Throughout both of his terms, he served on the Welsh Affairs Select Committee.

Edwards was first elected as Monmouth's MP at a by-election in May 1991, but lost the seat at the 1992 general election. He won it again in the 1997 and 2001 elections. Edwards lost the seat again in the 2005 election.

See also
1991 Monmouth by-election

References

External links 
 

Alumni of Manchester Metropolitan University
1953 births
Living people
Welsh Labour Party MPs
UK MPs 1987–1992
UK MPs 1997–2001
UK MPs 2001–2005
Alumni of the University of York
Monmouth, Wales